Phosphoinositide-3-kinase-interacting protein 1 is an enzyme that in humans is encoded by the PIK3IP1 gene.

References

Further reading